Imperial Library may refer to:
Imperial Library of Constantinople
Various libraries maintained by imperial households of China
Wenjin Chamber
Wenlan Chamber
Wenyuan Chamber
Former name of the National Library of India
Imperial Library (Japan), predecessor institution of the National Diet Library
Library of Trantor, a fictional galactic repository in the works of Isaac Asimov